Bianca Jakobsson (born 30 March 1993) is an Australian rules footballer playing for the St Kilda Football Club in the AFL Women's competition (AFLW). She previously played for Carlton and Melbourne.

AFLW career

Carlton
Jakobsson was drafted by Carlton with the club's first selection, the third overall in the 2016 AFL Women's draft. She made her debut in Round 1, 2017, in the club and the league's inaugural match at Ikon Park, against . Jakobsson is of Swedish descent. She finished the 2017 season having played in all seven of her side's matches that year.

Melbourne

Jakobsson's partner Darcy Guttridge also plays for AFLW club St Kilda.

Personal life
Jakobsson currently is studying for a Bachelor of Exercise and Sport Science at Deakin University.

References

External links

Living people
1993 births
Carlton Football Club (AFLW) players
Melbourne Football Club (AFLW) players
Australian rules footballers from Victoria (Australia)
Sportswomen from Victoria (Australia)
Australian people of Swedish descent
Victorian Women's Football League players
Lesbian sportswomen
Australian LGBT sportspeople
LGBT players of Australian rules football
St Kilda Football Club (AFLW) players
21st-century LGBT people